Auckland Stadiums is a division of Auckland Unlimited (formerly Regional Facilities Auckland), a unit of Auckland Council in New Zealand that manages Auckland's regional stadiums. Auckland Stadiums manages, operates and promotes Mount Smart Stadium, QBE (North Harbour) Stadium, and Western Springs Stadium

References

Government agencies of New Zealand